César Daniel Abregú (born 23 October 1994) is an Argentine professional footballer who plays as a midfielder for Deportivo La Merced.

Career
Abregú's first senior career team was San Martín; he joined their system in 2011. He remained with the club for six seasons, debuting in 2015 versus Chaco For Ever in Torneo Federal A on 28 August. Overall, he participated in thirty-four matches for the club; including in Primera B Nacional after San Martín were promoted in 2016. On 31 July 2017, Torneo Federal A side San Jorge signed Abregú. Fourteen appearances followed in all competitions, which preceded his departure in June 2018. January 2019 saw Abregú move to Atlético Concepción of the inaugural Torneo Regional Federal Amateur; a fourth tier.

In 2020, Abregú moved to Deportivo La Merced.

Personal life
Abregú is the brother of fellow footballer Gustavo Abregú, who also started his career with San Martín.

Career statistics
.

Honours
San Martín
Torneo Federal A: 2016

References

External links

1994 births
Living people
Sportspeople from San Miguel de Tucumán
Argentine footballers
Association football midfielders
Torneo Federal A players
Primera Nacional players
San Martín de Tucumán footballers
San Jorge de Tucumán footballers